Actinoquinol is a chemical compound that absorbs UVB light.

References

Quinolines
Sulfonic acids